The Battle of Baxi was fought between the warlords Liu Bei and Cao Cao in 215 during the prelude to the Three Kingdoms period of Chinese history. Liu Bei's forces, led by Zhang Fei, scored a victory over Cao Cao's army, which was led by Zhang He.

The battle
Cao Cao defeated Zhang Lu at the Battle of Yangping and conquered Hanzhong. He stationed Xiahou Yuan and Zhang He to defend the Han valley. Zhang He led several battalions from the main army separately south to Baxi, intending to evacuate and relocate civilians to Hanzhong. He advanced to Dangqu, Mengtou, Dangshi and opposed Zhang Fei's army for approximately 50 days. Zhang Fei directed more than 10,000 soldiers through an alternate route to intercept and ambush Zhang He from another direction. Zhang He's army was divided and its divisions were unable to support each other because of difficulty traversing the mountain paths, and Zhang Fei subsequently defeated Zhang He. Zhang He retreated, and arrived at Nanzheng with only a few dozen men.

Notes

References
Chen Shou. Records of Three Kingdoms.

210s conflicts
215
Baxi 215